The following outline is provided as an overview of and topical guide to Moldova:

Moldova (officially the Republic of Moldova) – landlocked country in Eastern Europe, located between Romania to the west and Ukraine to the north, east and south. The capital city is Chișinău. Moldova declared itself an independent state in 1991 as part of the dissolution of the Soviet Union. Moldova is a parliamentary republic with a president as head of state and a prime minister as head of government. A new constitution was adopted in 1994. A strip of Moldovan territory on the east bank of the river Dniester has been under the de facto control of the breakaway government of Transnistria since 1990. As a result of a decrease in industrial and agricultural output since the dissolution of the Soviet Union, the relative size of the service sector in Moldova's economy has grown to dominate its GDP and currently stands at over 60%. Moldova remains, however, the poorest country in Europe.

General reference 

 Pronunciation: 
 Common English country name:  Moldova
 Official English country name:  The Republic of Moldova
 Common endonym(s): Moldova
 Official endonym(s): Republica Moldova
 Adjectival(s): Moldovan
 Demonym(s): Moldovans
 Etymology: Name of Moldova
 ISO country codes:  MD, MDA, 498
 ISO region codes:  See ISO 3166-2:MD
 Internet country code top-level domain: .md

Geography of Moldova 

Geography of Moldova
 Moldova is: a landlocked country
 Location:
 Northern Hemisphere and Eastern Hemisphere
 Eurasia
 Europe
 Eastern Europe
 Time zone:  Eastern European Time (UTC+02), Eastern European Summer Time (UTC+03)
 Extreme points of Moldova
 High:  Dealul Bălănești 
 Low:  Dniester 
 Land boundaries:  
 
 
 Coastline:  none
 Population of Moldova: 3,572,700 (January 1, 2008) – 126th most populous country
 Area of Moldova: 
 Atlas of Moldova

Environment of Moldova 

 Climate of Moldova
 Renewable energy in Moldova
 Geology of Moldova
 Protected areas of Moldova
 Biosphere reserves in Moldova
 National parks of Moldova
 Wildlife of Moldova
 Fauna of Moldova
 Birds of Moldova
 Mammals of Moldova

Natural geographic features of Moldova 

 Rivers of Moldova
 World Heritage Sites in Moldova

Regions of Moldova

Administrative divisions of Moldova 

Administrative divisions of Moldova
 Districts of Moldova

Districts of Moldova 

Districts of Moldova

Municipalities of Moldova 

 (political) of Moldova: Chișinău
 Cities of Moldova
 List of towns in Moldova

Demography of Moldova 

Demographics of Moldova

Government and politics of Moldova 

Politics of Moldova
 Form of government:
 (political) of Moldova: Chișinău
 Elections in Moldova
 Political parties in Moldova

Branches of the government of Moldova 

Government of Moldova

Executive branch of the government of Moldova 
 Head of state: President of Moldova,
 Presidents of Moldova
 Head of government: Prime Minister of Moldova,
 Prime Ministers of Moldova
 Cabinet of Moldova

Legislative branch of the government of Moldova 

 Parliament of Moldova (unicameral)

Judicial branch of the government of Moldova 

 Supreme Court of Moldova
 Constitutional Court of Moldova

Foreign relations of Moldova 

Foreign relations of Moldova
 Diplomatic missions in Moldova
 Diplomatic missions of Moldova

International organization membership 
The Republic of Moldova is a member of:

Black Sea Economic Cooperation Zone (BSEC)
Central European Initiative (CEI)
Commonwealth of Independent States (CIS)
Council of Europe (CE)
Eurasian Economic Community (EAEC) (observer)
Euro-Atlantic Partnership Council (EAPC)
European Bank for Reconstruction and Development (EBRD)
Food and Agriculture Organization (FAO)
General Confederation of Trade Unions (GCTU)
International Atomic Energy Agency (IAEA)
International Bank for Reconstruction and Development (IBRD)
International Civil Aviation Organization (ICAO)
International Criminal Court (ICCt) (signatory)
International Criminal Police Organization (Interpol)
International Development Association (IDA)
International Federation of Red Cross and Red Crescent Societies (IFRCS)
International Finance Corporation (IFC)
International Fund for Agricultural Development (IFAD)
International Labour Organization (ILO)
International Maritime Organization (IMO)
International Monetary Fund (IMF)
International Olympic Committee (IOC)
International Organization for Migration (IOM)
International Organization for Standardization (ISO) (correspondent)
International Telecommunication Union (ITU)

Inter-Parliamentary Union (IPU)
Multilateral Investment Guarantee Agency (MIGA)
Organisation internationale de la Francophonie (OIF)
Organization for Democracy and Economic Development (GUAM)
Organization for Security and Cooperation in Europe (OSCE)
Organisation for the Prohibition of Chemical Weapons (OPCW)
Partnership for Peace (PFP)
Southeast European Cooperative Initiative (SECI)
United Nations (UN)
United Nations Conference on Trade and Development (UNCTAD)
United Nations Educational, Scientific, and Cultural Organization (UNESCO)
United Nations Industrial Development Organization (UNIDO)
United Nations Mission in Liberia (UNMIL)
United Nations Mission in the Sudan (UNMIS)
United Nations Observer Mission in Georgia (UNOMIG)
United Nations Operation in Cote d'Ivoire (UNOCI)
Uniunea Latină
Universal Postal Union (UPU)
World Customs Organization (WCO)
World Federation of Trade Unions (WFTU)
World Health Organization (WHO)
World Intellectual Property Organization (WIPO)
World Meteorological Organization (WMO)
World Tourism Organization (UNWTO)
World Trade Organization (WTO)

Law and order in Moldova 

Law of Moldova
 Declaration of Independence of Moldova
 Constitution of Moldova
 Crime in Moldova
 Law enforcement in Moldova
 Human rights in Moldova
 Freedom of religion in Moldova
 LGBT rights in Moldova

Military of Moldova 

Military of Moldova
 Command
 Commander-in-chief:
 Ministry of Defence of Moldova
 Forces
 Army of Moldova
 Navy of Moldova: None
 Air Force of Moldova
 Special forces of Moldova
 Military history of Moldova
 Military ranks of Moldova

Local government in Moldova 

Local government in Moldova

History of Moldova 

History of Moldova
 Bessarabia
 Moldavia
 Counties of Moldova
 History of the Jews in Moldova
 Military history of Moldova
 Prime Ministers of Moldova
 Presidents of Moldova

Culture of Moldova 

Culture of Moldova
 Architecture of Moldova
 Cuisine of Moldova
 Festivals in Moldova
 Languages of Moldova
 Media in Moldova
 Museums in Moldova
 National symbols of Moldova
 Coat of arms of Moldova
 Flag of Moldova
 National anthem of Moldova
 People of Moldova
 Common Moldovan surnames
 List of Moldovans
 Moldovan American
 Prostitution in Moldova
 Public holidays in Moldova
 Records of Moldova
 Scouting in Moldova
 World Heritage Sites in Moldova

The arts in Moldova 

Art in Moldova
 Cinema of Moldova
 Dance in Moldova 
 List of Moldovan dances
 Călușari - a traditional male folk dance
 Literature of Moldova
 Music of Moldova
 Television in Moldova
 Theatre in Moldova
 National Theatre Bucharest

Religion in Moldova 

Religion in Moldova
 Christianity in Moldova
 Moldovan Orthodox Church
 Hinduism in Moldova
 Islam in Moldova
 Judaism in Moldova
 Sikhism in Moldova

Sports in Moldova 

Sports in Moldova
 Football in Moldova
 Moldova at the Olympics

Economy and infrastructure of Moldova 

Economy of Moldova
 Economic rank, by nominal GDP (2007): 139th (one hundred and thirty ninth)
 Agriculture in Moldova
 Banking in Moldova
 National Bank of Moldova
 Communications in Moldova
 Internet in Moldova
 List of newspapers in Moldova
 Companies of Moldova
 Supermarkets in Moldova
 Currency of Moldova: Leu
 ISO 4217: MDL
 Energy in Moldova
 Energy policy of Moldova
 Oil industry in Moldova
 Health care in Moldova
 Mining in Moldova
 Moldova Stock Exchange
 Tourism in Moldova
 Transport in Moldova
 Airports in Moldova
 Rail transport in Moldova
 Roads in Moldova
 Water supply and sanitation in Moldova

Healthcare in Moldova 

Healthcare in Moldova

Education in Moldova 

Education in Moldova
 Museums in Moldova
 Universities in Moldova

See also 

Moldova
Index of Moldova-related articles
List of international rankings
List of Moldova-related topics
Member state of the United Nations
Outline of Europe
Outline of geography

References

External links 

 General
 Official site
 Official governmental site
 Official web site of the Parliament
 The EU's relations with Moldova (European Commission site)
 The Ministry of Foreign Affairs
 Embassy of the Republic of Moldova in the United States of America
 Embassy of the United States of America in the Republic of Moldova
 Elections in Moldova 2005
 General Local Elections 2007
 U.S. Department of State 2005 report about Human Rights in Moldova
 Dimitrie Cantemir-Descrierea Moldovei

 Profiles
 International Monetary Fund: Republic of Moldova: Statistical Appendix
 U.S. Department of State Post Reports - Moldova
 CIA - The World Factbook - Moldova
 ECMI - Information about Minority Issues in Moldova

 International rankings
 Bertelsmann, Bertelsmann Transformation Index:  2006, ranked 75th out of 119 countries
 Reporters without borders: Annual worldwide press freedom index (2005), ranked 74th out of 167 countries
 The Wall Street Journal: 2005 Index of Economic Freedom, ranked 77th out of 155 countries
 The Economist: The World in 2005 - Worldwide quality-of-life index, 2005, ranked 99th out of 111 countries
 Transparency International: Corruption Perceptions Index 2005, ranked 88th out of 158 countries
 United Nations Development Programme: Human Development Index 2005, ranked 116th out of 177 countries
 World Economic Forum, Global Competitiveness Report: 2005-2006, ranked 82nd out of 117 countries
 World Bank: Doing Business 2006, ranked 83rd out of 155
 World Bank: Ease of Starting a Business 2006, ranked 69th out of 155
 United Nations Conference on Trade and Development: Foreign Direct Investment Performance Index 2004, ranked 35th out of 140

 Media
 Moldova In The World - online journal
 Moldpres - state owned news agency

 Others
 Moldova 2006 Investment Climate Statement
 Moldova: Young Women From Rural Areas Vulnerable To Human Trafficking
 OurNet — Moldova Internet Resources
 Web.MD — Moldova Web Directory
 General Information about Moldova

Moldova